Alice Marie Degeer-Adère (born Alice Marie Adère also known as Alice Berteau (4 May 1902, Montegnée - 15 November 1977, Liège)  was a Belgian politician. She was one of the first Belgian women elected to the Chamber of Representatives in 1936. She was a member of the Communist Party of Belgium (PCB) from 1931.

Life 
From the age of 14, as a laborer in a coke oven. In 1921, she was fired for participating in a strike at the Ougrée-Marihaye steel plant. In 1931, she joined the Communist Party. In September 1931, she attended the International Lenin School. She was secretary of the Seraing regional committee of the Communist Party.

In 1936, she was elected to the Chamber of Representatives; she was re-elected in 1939. Until 1940, she was one of the only three women elected directly to the Chamber, with Lucie Dejardin, and Isabelle Blume.

On 10 May 1940, she was arrested in front of Parliament by the Belgian authorities, as a Communist. She was deported to the Gurs internment camp , then freed in July thanks to efforts by Jean Fonteyne. She was active in the Partisans Armés. In 1946, she was elected to the Senate, for Mons. She was excluded from the Communist Party in October 1948.

References 

1902 births
1977 deaths
Belgian political people
Belgian communists